Darcelle XV Showplace is a drag venue in Portland, Oregon, opened and operated by drag performer Darcelle XV.

History
The club opened in 1967. In June 2020, the venue was nominated for national historic registry status by the State Advisory Committee on Historic Preservation, marking the first time an LGBT-related establishment was considered in Oregon. The site was listed in November 2020. The venue launched drag brunch in September.

Reception
Darcelle's won in the "Best Drag Show" category of Willamette Week "Best of Portland Readers' Poll 2020".

See also
 National Register of Historic Places listings in Northwest Portland, Oregon

References

External links
 
 

1967 establishments in Oregon
Drag (clothing)
LGBT culture in Portland, Oregon
LGBT places in the United States
National Register of Historic Places in Portland, Oregon
Northwest Portland, Oregon
Old Town Chinatown